Marie-Françoise Hervieu (born 20 January 1972) is a Canadian fencer. She competed in the women's team foil event at the 1992 Summer Olympics.

References

External links
 

1972 births
Living people
Sportspeople from Quebec City
Canadian female fencers
Olympic fencers of Canada
Fencers at the 1992 Summer Olympics
French Quebecers
Pan American Games medalists in fencing
Pan American Games bronze medalists for Canada
Fencers at the 1995 Pan American Games
20th-century Canadian women